Dr. Bombay can refer to:
 Dr. Bombay (character), a character from  the TV series Bewitched (1964–1972)
 Jonny Jakobsen, a Swedish artist performing under the name "Dr. Bombay"